Gürçeşme can refer to:

 Gürçeşme, Biga
 Gürçeşme, Devrek